This is a list of the Sheriffs and (after 1 April 1974) High Sheriffs of Wiltshire.

Until the 14th century, the shrievalty was held ex officio by the castellans of Old Sarum Castle.

On 1 April 1974, under the provisions of the Local Government Act 1972, the title of Sheriff of Wiltshire was retitled as High Sheriff of Wiltshire.

Sheriff

To 1400

1066: Edric
1067–1070: Philippe de Buckland
1085: Aiulphus the Sheriff
1070–1105: Edward of Salisbury
1110: William of Pont de L'Arche
1119: Edward d'Évreux
1120: Humphrey "The Great" De BOHUN (2º B. Bohun of Taterford) – Bearer of the Royal Standard in 1120 in the battle of Benneville in Normandy
????: Walter FitzEdward of Salisbury
1130: Warin de Lisures or Lisoriis
????: "William the Late Sheriff", so called in 1155
1152–1159: Patrick of Salisbury, 1st Earl of Salisbury
1160–1162: Richard Clericus (Richard de Wilton)
1163: Milo de Dauntesey
1164–1181: Richard de Wilton or de Wilteshire
1181: Michael Belet and Robert Malde (Mauduit)
1182: ditto 1181 and Roger Fitz Renfr or Renf
1183–1187: Robert Mauduit
1189: Hugh Bardolf
1190: William of Salisbury, 2nd Earl of Salisbury, son of Patrick
1191: Robert de Tregoz
1192: William d'Évreux (as above)
1193–1197: William d'Évreux (as above) and Thomas d'Évreux (otherwise Devereux) his son
1197–1198: Stephen of Thornham and Alexander de Ros
1199: Stephen of Thornham and Wandragesil de Courselles
1200–1203: William Longespee, 3rd Earl of Salisbury and Robert de Berneres
1207: Geoffrey de Neville
1210: Robert de Veteriponte (i.e., de Vipont) jointly with Nicholas de Vipont
1211–1212: Robert de Veteriponte (i.e., de Vipont)
1215–1225: William Longespee, 3rd Earl of Salisbury (died in office)
1226: Simon de Hale, or de Hales (previously Sheriff of Yorkshire 1223-5)
1227: Ela of Salisbury, 3rd Countess of Salisbury and John Dacus
1228: John of Monmouth and Walter de Bumesey
1229–1230: John of Monmouth
1231–1234: Ela of Salisbury, 3rd Countess of Salisbury and John Dacus
1235: Ela of Salisbury, 3rd Countess of Salisbury and Robert de Hogesham
1236: Ela of Salisbury, 3rd Countess of Salisbury
1237: William Gerebred / Robert de Hogesham
1238–1239: Robert de Hogesham
1240–1245: Nicholas de Haversham
1246–1248: Nicholas de Lusteshull
1249–1252: William de Tynchiden
1253–1254: William de Tenhide and his son John
1255–1257: John de Verund
1258–1259: John de Verund and Geoffrey Scudamor (otherwise Scudamore)
1260: John de Verund
1261–1263: Rad. [i.e. Radulphus otherwise Rafe or Ralph] Cussell
1264: Rad. de Aungers and John de Aungers
1265: Rad. de Aungers
1266–1270: William de Duy and Stephen de Edworth
1271: Stephen de Edwarth and Walter de Strichesley
1272–1274: Walter de Strichesley
1275–1280: Hildebrand of London (otherwise Sir Hildebrand de Londres)
1281–1288: John de Wotton
1289–1290: Richard de Combe
1291–1295: Thomas de St Omero (otherwise de St-Omer)
1296–1298: Walter Pavely (otherwise Paveley)
1299–1300: John of Newtown
1301–1303: John of Hertinger
1304: Henry of Cobham
1305–1306: John de Gerberge
1307: Andreas de Grimstead
1308–1309: Alex Cheverell and John de Sto Laudo (otherwise de St Lo or Saint Lowe)
1310: William de Harden
1311: Adam Walrand
1312–1313: Adam Walrand and John Kingston
1314: John de Holt and Sir Philip de la Beche
1315–1316: Sir Philip de la Beche
1317–1319: Walter de Risum
1320–1321: Adam de Tichbourne and Adam Walrand
1322: Walter le Longe
1323–1325: Sir Adam Walrand
1327: Sir Adam Walrand
1328: Sir Philip de la Beche
1329–1331: Sir John Mauduit
1332: Gifford le Long
1333: John Mauduit and William Randolph
1334: John Tichbourne and John Mauduit
1335–1336: Gilbert de Berewik and Reginald de Paveley
1337: Sir Peter Doynel and Gilbert de Berewik (i.e. de Berwick)
1338–1340: John Mauduit
1341: Thomas de Sto Mauro (otherwise Seymour) and Robert Lokes
1342–1344: John Mauduit
1345–1346: John Roches
1347: John Roches and Thomas Semor (otherwise Seymour, see also 1341)
1348–1350: Robert Russell
1350:
1351–1353: Thomas de la River
1354: John Everard of Stratford-sub-Castle
1355–1360: Thomas Hungerford
1361–1366: Henry Sturmy
1367–1371: Walter de Haywood
1372: William de Worston
1373: Henry Sturmy
1374: Sir John Dauntsey
1375: Sir John Delamare
1376–1377: Ralph Cheyne
1378: Peter de Cusaunce and William de Worston
1379–1380: Rad. (i.e. Radulphus) de Norton
1381: Laurence de Sco. Martino (otherwise de St Martin) and Hugo Cheyne
1382: Nicholas Woodhall
1383: Sir Bernard Brocas
1384–1385: John Lancaster
1386–1387: John Salesbury
1388–1389: Ralph Cheyne
1390: Richard Mawarden of Stratford sub Castle
1391: John Roches
1392: Robert Dyneley of Fittleton
1393: John Gawen of Norrington
1394: Richard Mawarden of Stratford sub Castle
1395: Sir John Moigne (or Moyne) of Owermoigne
1396: Thomas Bonham
1397–1399: Richard Mawarden of Stratford sub Castle
1400: John Dauntsey

15th century

1401: William Worfton of Broad Hinton and John Gawayne
1402: William Cheyne of Brooke
1403–1404: Walter Beauchamp
1405: Walter Hungerford
1406: Rad. (i.e. Radulphus for Rafe or Ralph) Grene (otherwise Green)
1407: Walter Beauchamp
1408: Sir Robert Corbet
1409: William Cheyne
1410: Sir John Berkeley of Beverston Castle
1411: Thomas Bonham
1413: Sir Elias Delamere, Kt, of Fisherton Delamere
1414: Henry Thorpe of Newton Tony
1415: Thomas Calstone (otherwise Calston) of Littlecote and Upton Lovell
1416: Robert Andrewe (or Andrew)
1417: William Finderne
1418: Sir William Sturmy, of Wulfhall
1419: Thomas Ringwood, of Loveraz Coulesfield
1420–1421: William Darell, of Littlecote
1422: William Darell, of Littlecote (see 1420)
1423: Sir Robert Shotesbrook (or Shottesbrook), Kt
1424: William Finderne
1425: Walter Pauncefoot
1426: John Stourton, of Stourton
1427: William Darell, of Littlecote (see 1420)
1428: John Pawlet, of Fisherton Delamere
1429: Sir John Bayntun, Kt, of Fallersdon
1430: David Cervington, of Longford Castle
1431: Sir John Seymour, of Wulfhall
1432: Walter Strickland
1433: Sir John Stourton, of Stourton (see 1426)
1434: Sir Stephen Popham of Popham
1435: Edmund or Edward Hungerford
1436: William Beauchamp
1437: Sir John Stourton (see 1426)
1438: Sir John VI Lisle
1439: John St Loe (or Saint Lowe)
1440: John Norris
1441: Richard Restwold of Crowmarsh Gifford, Oxfordshire and Sindlesham, Berkshire
1442: William Beauchamp
1443: Sir John Bainton (otherwise Bayntun, see 1429), of Falstone (or Fallersdon) and of Shaw near Melksham
1444: John Basket, of Lydiard Millicent
1445: Richard Restwold of Crowmarsh Gifford, Oxfordshire and Sindlesham, Berkshire
1446: William Stafford
1447: William Beauchamp
1448: John Norreys
1449: Philip Baynard, of Lackham
1450: Sir John Seymour of Wulfhall
1451: John Nanson
1452: Edward Stradling, of Dauntsey
1453: John Willoughby, of Brooke Hall near Westbury
1454: George Darell, of Littlecote
1455: Sir Reginald Stourton, Kt, of Stourton
1456: Henry Long, of Wraxall
1457: Sir John Seymour, of Wulfhall
1458: Hugh Pilkenham or Pekenham
1459: John Ferris, of Blunsdon St Andrew
1461: George Darell
1462–1463: Sir Reginald Stourton, Kt, of Stourton (see 1456)
1464: Sir Roger Tocotes, Kt
1465: Sir George Darell, Kt
1466: Sir Thomas de la Mare, Kt
1467: Christopher Wolsley
1468: Sir Richard Darell, Kt
1469: Sir George Darell, Kt
1470: Sir Laurence Raynsford, Kt
1471: Sir Roger Tocotes, Kt
1472: Sir Maurice Berkeley, Kt
1473: Sir John Willoughby, Kt
1474: William Collingbourne, of Collingbourne Ducis
1475: Henry Long of Wraxall
1476: Walter Bonham
1477: Edward Hartgill
1478: John Mompesson, of Bathampton Wyly
1479: Walter Hungerford, of Farley Castle
1480: Charles Bulkeley
1481: William Collingbourne, of Collingbourne Ducis
1482: John Mompesson
1483: Henry Long of Wraxall
1484: Edward Hartgill
1485: Sir Roger Tocotes, Kt
1486: John Wroughton, of Broad Hinton
1487: Sir John Turberville, Kt (? of Bere Regis, Dorset)
1488: Thomas Vinour
1489: Sir Edward Darell of Littlecote (1st term)
1490: Constantius (i.e. Constantine) Darell, of Collingbourne Ducis
1491: John Lye, of Flamstone in Bishopstone
1492: John Yorke, of Helthrop, near Ramsbury
1493: Sir Edward Darell of Littlecote (2nd term)
1494: Richard Puddesey
1495: Constantius (i.e. Constantine) Darell, of Collingbourne Ducis
1496: George Chaderton (otherwise Chadderton or Chatterton), of Lydiard Millicent
1497: Sir Edward Darell of Littlecote (3rd term)
1498: Sir George Seymour, Kt
1499: Sir John Huddlestone, Kt
1500: Sir Thomas Long, Kt, of South Wraxall and Draycot

16th century

1501: John Yorke
1502: Sir William Callaway
1503: Sir John Danvers, Kt, of Dauntsey
1504: John Ernle, of Etchilhampton
1505: John Gawayne, of Norrington
1506: Sir Thomas Long, Kt (see 1500)
1507: Sir John Seymour, Kt, of Wulfhall
1508: John Mompesson
1509: Sir Edward Darell of Littlecote (4th term)
1510: Sir Walter Hungerford, Kt
1511: Henry Long, Kt of Draycot Cerne (1st term)
1512: Sir Christopher Wroughton, Kt, of Broad Hinton
1513: Sir John Danvers, Kt, of Dauntsey
1514: William Bonham, of Bonham, at Stourton and Great Wishford
1515: Sir John Scrope, Kt, of Castle Combe and Oxendon
1516: Sir Nicholas Wadham (died 1542) of Merryfield, Somerset and Edge, Devon.
1517: Sir Edward Hungerford, Kt
1518: Sir John Seymour, Kt of Wulfhall (see 1507)
1519: Sir Edward Darell of Littlecote (5th term)
1520: John Skilling, of Draycott Foliat
1521: John Ernle (otherwise Erneley), of Bourton, Bishop's Cannings
1522: Sir Edward Bayntun, Kt, of Bromham
1523: Thomas Yorke
1524: Sir John Seymour, Kt, of Wulfhall (see 1518)
1525: Sir Henry Long, Kt of Draycot Cerne (2nd term)
1526: Sir John Bourchier, Kt
1527: Sir Anthony Hungerford of Down Ampney, Gloucestershire
1528: John Ernle (otherwise Erneley)
1529: John Horsey, of Martin
1530: Thomas Yorke
1531: Thomas Bonham, of Great Wishford
1532: John Ernle (otherwise Erneley)
1533: Sir Walter Hungerford, Kt of Farley Castle
1534: Robert Baynard, of Lackham
1535: Thomas Yorke (see 1530)
1536: Sir Henry Long, Kt of Draycot Cerne (3rd term)
1537: Sir John Brydges, Kt
1538: Sir Anthony Hungerford, Kt (see 1527)
1539: John Ernle (otherwise Erneley), of Bishop's Cannings
1540: Edward Mompesson
1541: Sir Henry Long, Kt of Draycot Cerne (4th term)
1542: John Marvyn of Fonthill Gifford (1st term)
1543: John Ernle (otherwise Erneley), of Bishop's Cannings
1544: Robert Hungerford, of Cadenham
1545: Charles Bulkeley
1546: Richard Scrope, of Castle Combe
1547: Silvester Danvers, of Dauntsey
1548: Ambrose Dauntsey
1549: John Bonham of Hazelbury
1550: John Marvyn of Fonthill Gifford (2nd term)
1551: William Stumpe died and replaced by Sir James Stumpe of Charlton and Malmesbury (1st term)
1552: Sir William Sharington (or Sherington), Kt, of Lacock Abbey (died in office)
1553: Edward Baynard, of Lackham
1553: John Ernle (otherwise Erneley) of Bishop's Cannings
1554: Robert Hungerford of Cadnam (otherwise Cadenham)
1555: John St John, of Lydiard Tregoze
1556: Sir Anthony Hungerford, Kt, of Down Ampney, Gloucestershire
1557: Sir Walter Hungerford of Farley Castle
1558: Henry Brouncker, of Melksham
1558: Sir John Zouche, Kt, of Calstone near Calne
1559: Sir James Stumpe of Charlton and Malmesbury (2nd term)
1559: George Ludlow
1560: Sir John Marvyn of Pertwood and Fonthill Gifford (3rd term)
1561: George Penruddock of Ivy Church, Laverstock, and Compton Chamberlayne
1562: John Ernle (otherwise Erneley) of Bishop's Cannings (see 1553)
1563: William Button of Alton Priors
1564: John Eyre of Great Chalfield
1565: Nicholas Snell of Kington St Michael
1566: Henry Sherington, of Lacock Abbey
1567: George Ludlow, of Hill Deverill
1568: Sir John Thynne of Longleat
1569: William Button, of Alton Priors and Stowell
1570: Edward Bayntun, of Rowdon
1571: John St John, of Lydiard Tregoze (see 1555)
1572: Sir Walter Hungerford of Farley Castle (see 1557)
1573: Sir John Danvers of Dauntsey
1574: Sir Robert Long of Wraxall and Draycott
1575: Sir Thomas Wroughton of Broad Hinton
1576: Sir John Hungerford, Kt, of Down Ampney, Gloucestershire
1577: Sir Henry Knyvett, Kt, of Charlton
1578: Nicholas St John of Lydiard Park, Lydiard Tregoze
1579: Michael Ernle (otherwise Erneley), of Bourton, in Bishop's Cannings, and Whetham, Calne
1580: William Brouncker of Melksham
1581: Sir Walter Hungerford (see 1572)
1582: Jasper Moore of Heytesbury
1583: John Snell of Kington St Michael
1584: Sir John Danvers of Dauntsey (see 1573)
1585: Edmund Ludlow of Hill Deverill
1586: Richard Moody, of Garsdon, near Malmesbury
1587: Sir Walter Hungerford (see 1581)
1588: Henry Willoughby, of Knoyle Odierne or West Knoyle
1589: John Warneford, of Sevenhampton near Highworth
1590: William Eyre of Great Chalfield
1591: Sir John Hungerford of Down Ampney, Gloucestershire
1592: Sir John Thynne of Longleat and Caus Castle, Shropshire
1593: John Hungerford, of Stoke near Great Bedwyn
1594: Sir Henry Sadleir (otherwise Sadler or Sadlier) of Everley
1595: John Dauntsey, of West Lavington
1596: Sir James Mervyn, Kt, of Fonthill Gifford
1597: Edward Penruddock of Compton Chamberlayne
1598: Thomas Snell, of Kington St Michael
1599: Walter Vaughan of Falstone House, Bishopstone nr Salisbury
1600: Sir Walter Long, Kt of South Wraxall and Draycot

17th century

1601: Henry Bayntun of Bromham House
1602: Sir Jasper Moore of Heytesbury
1603: Sir Jasper Moore, Kt, of Heytesbury
1604: Sir Alexander Tutt of Idmiston
1605: John Hungerford of Cadnam, Bremhill
1606: Gabriel Pile
1607: Sir Thomas Thynne, Kt, of Longleat
1608: Richard Goddard, of Standon Hussey
1609: John Ayliffe, of Brinkworth and Grittenham
1610: Sir Giles Wroughton, Kt, of Broad Hinton
1611: Sir William Button, 1st Baronet, of Alton Priors and of Tockenham Court, Lyneham
1612: Francis Popham, of Littlecote
1613: Sir William Pawlett, Kt, of Edington
1614: Henry Mervyn of Pertwood and Fonthill Giffard
1615: Thomas Moore, of Heytesbury
1616: Sir Richard Grobham, Kt, of Great Wishford, Berwick St Leonard and Nettleton
1617: Sir John Horton, Kt, of Iford and Westwood
1618: Sir Henry Moody of Garsdon, near Malmesbury
1619: Sir Henry Poole of Oaksey
1620: Sir Charles Pleydell, Kt, of Midgehall in Lydiard Tregoze
1621: Sir William Pawlett, Kt, of Edington
1622: Sir John Lambe Kt, of Coulston
1623: Gifford Long of Rowde Ashton
1624: Edward Reade, of Corsham
1625: Sir Francis Seymour
1626: Sir Giles Estcourt, 1st Baronet of Long Newnton
1627: Sir Walter Long, Bt of Whaddon
1628: John Duckett, of Hartham near Corsham
1629: Sir Robert Baynard of Lackham
1630: John Topp of Stockton
1631: Sir Edward Hungerford of Corsham and Farleigh Hungerford
1632: Sir John St John, of Lydiard Tregoze
1633: Sir Henry Ludlow, of Maiden Bradley
1634: Francis Goddard, of Standon Hussey and Cliffe Pypard
1635: Sir George Ayliffe, Kt, of Foxley and Grittenham in Brinkworth
1636: Sir Nevil Poole, Kt, of Poole Keynes
1637: Sir Edward Bayntun of Bromham House, Bromham
1638: John Grubbe, of Potterne and Cherhill
1639: John Duke, of Lake
1640: Giles Eyre, of Brickworth
1641: Robert Chivers, of Calne, Quemerford, and Leigh Delamere
1642: Sir George Vaughan, Kt, of Fallersdon
1643: Sir John Penruddocke, Kt, of Compton Chamberlayne
1644: Sir James Long, Bt, of Draycot Cerne
1645: Edmund Ludlow, of Hill Deverill, and Alexander Thistlethwaite, of Winterslow
1646: Sir Henry Chalk (?Choke), Kt
1647: Sir Anthony Ashley-Cooper, Bt
1648: Edward Tooker, of Maddington
1649: William Calley, of Burderop
1650: Thomas Bond of Ogbourne St George
1651: Lawrence Washington of Garsdon, near Malmesbury
1652: Sir Henry Clerk, Kt, of Enford near Amesbury
1653: Thomas Long, of Little Cheverell
1654: Hugh Audley (otherwise Awdley), of Colepark, Malmesbury
1655: John Dove, of Salisbury
1656: Robert Hippesley, of Stanton Fitzwarren near Highworth
1657: (?Robert) Hippesley
1658: John Ernle of Bourton in Bishop's Cannings and of Whetham in Calne
1659: Isaac Burgess
1660: Edward Horton, of Great Chaldfield, near Bradford
1661: Sir James Thynne of Longleat
1662: Sir Walter Ernle, 1st Baronet of Etchilhampton
1663: Sir Henry Coker, Kt, of Hill Deverill
1664: Sir Edward Bayntun of Bromham
1665: Thomas Mompesson, of Corton in Boyton
12 November 1665: Sir John Weld, of Compton Bassett
7 November 1666: Christopher Willoughby, of Bishopstone
6 November 1667: John Long, of Little Cheverell
6 November 1668: Sir Richard Grobham Howe, of Berwick St Leonard
11 November 1669: John Hall, of Bradford-on-Avon
4 November 1670: Sir Robert Button, 3rd Baronet, of Tockenham Court, Lyneham
9 November 1671: Sir Walter Long, 1st Baronet, of Whaddon
11 November 1672: Walter Smith, of Shalbourne and Great Bedwyn
12 November 1673: Bernard Pawlett, of Cottles, near Bradford
5 November 1674: Thomas Goddard, of Swindon
15 November 1675: Sir Matthew Andrews, of Mere
10 November 1676: Giles Earl
18 November 1676: Richard Hart
23 November 1676: John Hawkins, of Ashton Keynes
17 November 1677: Henry Chivers, of Calne and Quemerford
14 November 1678: John Hawkins, of Ashton Keynes
13 November 1679: Giles Earle 
late 1679: Thomas Earle, of Eastcourt House, Crudwell
4 November 1680: John Jacob
1681: Thomas Gore, of Alderton
1682: Richard Lewis, of Edington
1683: Sir Edmund Warneford of Sevenhampton near Highworth
1684: George Willoughby of Bishopstone
1685: (John Davenant: altered to) William Chafyn, of Zeals Monachorum
1686: John Davenant, of Landford in Frustfield Hundred
1687: Richard Chaundler of Idmiston
1688: Sir Jeremy Craye, Kt
1689: John Wyndham of Norrington
1690: (James Blatch: altered to) Stephen Blatch, of Westbury
1691: Henry Wallis, of Trowbridge
1692: Henry Nourse (altered to Sir William Pynsent, Bt, and again to Henry Nourse)
1693: Sir Thomas Estcourt, Kt, of Sherston Pinkney
1694: Sir William Pynsent, Bt of Urchfont
1695: Gifford Yerbury
1696: Joseph Houlton, of Trowbridge
1697: John Benett, of Norton Bavant
1698: Thomas Baskerville, (? of Richardston near Winterbourne Basset)
1699: (Walter Ernle: altered to) John Kyrle (otherwise Curll), of Turley near Bradford
1700: (Joseph Houlton: altered to) Francis Merewether of Easterton, Market Lavington

18th century

1701: Richard Jones of Ramsbury
1702: (William Willoughby: altered to) Christopher Willoughby, of West Knoyle
1703: Richard Long of Collingbourne
1704: Walter Long of South Wraxall
1705: John Flower, of Grimstead, or of Worton, near Devizes
1706: (Thomas Blatch: altered to) Andrew Duke, of Bulford
1707: Sir James Ashe, 2nd Baronet
1708: Francis Kenton
1709: (Oliver Calley: altered to) Walter Ernle, of Conock, Chirton
1710: William Benson of Amesbury
1711: Daniel Webb of Monkton Farleigh
1712: John Cox of Kemble, near Malmesbury
1713: John Smith, of Alton Priors
1714: Richard Goddard of Swindon
1715: Matthew Pitts, of Salisbury
1716: John Eyles, of Devizes
1717: Robert Houlton replaced by Calthorpe Parker Long then Thomas Bennett of Steeple Ashton
1718: George Speke Petty, of Cheney Court and Haselbury House, Box
1719: John Askew, of Lydiard Millicent
1720: Caleb Bayley replaced by John Vilett, of Swindon
1721: Henry Read, of Crowood
1722: Edward Hill, of Wanborough
1723: Ralph Freke, of Hannington, near Highworth
1724: Joseph Houlton, of Farleigh Hungerford, Somerset, and Grittleton, Wiltshire
1725: John Hippesley, of Stanton Fitzwarren
1726: Henry Long, of Melksham
1727: John Mills, of Cherhill, Calne replaced by William Coleman
1728: Walter Hungerford of Studley House, Calne
1729: Henry Hungerford, of Fyfield, Milton Lislebonne
1730: Ezekiel Wallace (or Wallis), of Lucknam, Colerne
1731: Henry Skilling, of Draycott Foliat
1732: John Smith, of Whitley, Calne
1733: Job Polden, of Imber
1734: Thomas Phipps, of Westbury Leigh and Chalford
1735: William Vilett, of Swindon
1736: Richard Baskerville, of Berwick Bassett
1736: Edward Mortimer, of Trowbridge 
1737: William Hedges of Compton Bassett
1738: Isaac Warriner, of Conock, Chirton
1739: William Wyndham, of Dinton
1740: Edward Mortimer, of Trowbridge (or William Wyndham?)
1741: Anthony Guy, of Chippenham
1742: William Batt, of Salisbury
1743: John or William Hippesley, of Stanton Fitzwarren
1744: (John Walters of Titherley: altered to) Fulke Greville, of Wilbury House, Newton Toney
1745: Walter Long, of Salisbury, Wiltshire, and Preshaw, Hampshire
1746: Godfrey Huckle Kneller, of Donhead Hall, Donhead St Mary
1747: William Phipps, of Heywood
1748: Thomas Phipps, of Westbury Leigh
1749: Thomas Cooper, of Salisbury
1750: James Bartlett, of Salisbury
1751: Charles Penruddocke, of Compton Chamberlayne
1752: Thomas Cooper, of Cumberwell, near Bradford
1753: Edward Polhill, of Heale House, Woodford, near Salisbury
1754: William Phipps, of Westbury Leigh
1755: Arthur Evans, of the Close, Salisbury
1756: John Jacob, of Tockenham Wick House, Lyneham
1757: William Coles, of the Close, Salisbury
1758: Thomas Bennett (otherwise Benett), of Pyt House
1759: William Norris, of Nonesuch House, Bromham
1760: George Flower, of Devizes
1761: Scrope (otherwise Scroop) Egerton, of Salisbury
1762: Prince Sutton, of Devizes
1763: John Talbot of Lacock Abbey
1764: Walter Long (of South Wraxall)
1765: Benjamin Adamson, of Kemble
1766: Edward Medlicott, of Warminster
1767: Edward Goddard, of Cliffe Pypard
1768: Edmund Lambert, of Boyton
1769: William Talk, of Salisbury (New Sarum)
1770: Thomas Maundrell, of Blacklands, near Calne
1771: William Langham, of Ramsbury Manor
1772: Henry Penruddocke Wyndham, of the College, Salisbury
1773: Edward Poore, of Rushall
1774: Thomas Estcourt, of Newnton
1775: Francis Dugdale Astley, of Everley
1776: William Northey, of the Ivy House, Chippenham
1777: Joseph Colborne, of Hardenhuish, Chippenham
1778: William Beach, of Nether Avon House
1779: Robert Cooper, of Salisbury
1780: Paul Cobb Methuen of Corsham House
1781: William Hayter, of Newton Toney
1782: William Bowles, of Heale House
1783: Thomas Hussey, of Salisbury
1784: William Chaffin Grove of Zeals House, Mere
1785: James Sutton of New Park, Devizes [or of Roundway]
1786: Seymour Wroughton, of Eastcott, Urchfont
1787: Isaac William Webb Horlock, of Ashwick, Marshfield, Gloucestershire
1788: Robert Ashe, of Langley Burrell
1789: Thomas Grove, of Ferne
1790: Gifford Warriner, of Conock, Chirton
1791: John Awdry, of Notton, Lacock
1792: Matthew Humphries, of the Ivy House, Chippenham
1793: John Gaisford, of Iford House, near Bradford
1794: Richard Godolphin Long, of Rood Ashton
1795: James Montagu, of Alderton and Lackham
1796: Gilbert Trowe Beckett Turner, of Penley House, Westbury
1797: Sir John Methuen Poore, 1st Bt. of Rushall
1798: John Benett of Pyt House
1799: Edward Hinxman, of Little Durnford
1800: George Yalden Fort, of Alderbury

19th century

11 February 1801: Thomas Bush, of Bradford
3 February 1802: Sir Andrew Bayntun-Rolt, 2nd Baronet, of Spye Park
3 February 1803: Thomas Henry Hele Phipps, of Leighton House, Westbury
1 February 1804: Wadham Locke, of Rowde Ford
6 February 1805: Sir Richard Colt Hoare, 2nd Baronet, of Stourhead
1 February 1806: John Paul Paul, of Ashton Keynes
4 February 1807: Thomas Calley, of Burderop Park
3 February 1808: John Houlton, of Grittleton
6 February 1809: Sir Charles Warre Malet, 1st Baronet, of Wilbury House
31 January 1810: Abraham Ludlow, of Heywood House
8 February 1811: Harry Biggs, of Stockton
24 January 1812: Sir William Pierce Ashe A'Court, 1st Baronet, of Heytesbury House
10 February 1813: William Fowle, of Chute, Wiltshire
4 February 1814: William Wyndham, of Dinton, Wiltshire
13 February 1815: George Eyre, of Bramshaw
1816: John Hussey, of Salisbury
1817: John Hungerford Penruddocke, of Compton Chamberlayne
1818: Alexander Powell, of Hurdcott
1819: John Long, of Monkton Farleigh
1820: Ambrose Goddard, of Swindon
1821: Ambrose Awdry, of Seend, near Devizes
1822: Edward Phillips, of Melksham
1823: John Fuller, of Neston Park, Corsham
1824: Sir Edward Poore Bt, of Rushall
1825: Ernle Warriner, of Conock, Chirton
1826: Thomas Clutterbuck, of Hardenhuish
1827: Thomas Baskerville Mynors Baskerville, of Rockley House, near Marlborough
1828: George Wroughton Wroughton, of Wilcot House, near Pewsey
1829: George Heneage Walker Heneage, of Compton Bassett
1830: Edward William Leyborne Popham, of Littlecote House
1831: Paul Methuen, of Corsham House
1832: Sir Edmund Antrobus, 2nd Baronet, of Amesbury
1833: William Temple, of Bishopstrow, Warminster
1834: Thomas Bolton, of Brickworth
1835: Henry Seymour, of Knoyle
1836: Sir John Dugdale Astley, 1st Baronet, of Everley
1837: Sir Frederick Hutchison Hervey Bathurst, 3rd Baronet, of Clarendon
1838: Thomas Assheton Smith, of Tedworth House, near Ludgershall
1839: Charles Lewis Phipps, of Wans House
1840: William Henry Fox Talbot, of Lacock Abbey
1841: Ambrose Hussey, of Salisbury
1842: Frederick William Rooke, of Lackham
1843: Henry Stephen Olivier, of Potterne
1844: George Edward Eyre, or Warrens, Bramshaw
1845: Wade Browne, of Monkton Farleigh
1846: The Right Honourable Jacob Pleydell Bouverie, Viscount Folkestone, of Longford Castle
1847: Wadham Locke, of Ashton Giffard
1848: John Henry Campbell Wyndham, of The College, Salisbury
1849: Robert Parry Nisbet, of South Broom House, Devizes
1850: Henry Gaisford Gibbs Ludlow, of Heywood House, Westbury
1851: Graham Moore Michell Esmeade, of Monkton, Chippenham
1852: John Bird Fuller, of Neston Park, Corsham
1853: Francis Leybourne Popham, of Chilton
1854: Edmund Lewis Clutterbuck, of Hardenhuish
1855: Simon Watson Taylor, of Urchfont
1856: Charles William Miles, of Burton Hill House, Malmesbury
1857: Alfred Morrison, of Fonthill
1858: Francis Alexander Sydenham Locke, of Rowdeford
1859: John Neilson Gladstone, of Bowdon Park
1860: Horatio Nelson Goddard, of Cliffe Manor House, Cliffe Pypard
1861: Charles Penruddocke, of Compton Chamberlayne
1862: John Elton Mervyn Prower, of Purton House, Purton, near Swindon
1863: Thomas Fraser Grove, of Ferne
1864: John Lewis Phipps, of Leighton House, Westbury
1865: Thomas Henry Allen Poynder, of Hartham Park, near Chippenham
1866: Ambrose Denis Hussey-Freke, of Hannington Hall, Highworth
1867: Henry Calley, of Burderop Park
1868: Charles John Thomas Conolly, of Cottles House, near Melksham
1869: Ralph Ludlow Lopes, of Sandridge Park, Melksham
1870: John Ravenhill, of Ashton Gifford House
1871: John William Gooch Spicer, of Spye Park
1872: Sir John Neald, of Grittleton House
1873: Nathaniel Barton, of Corsley House, Warminster
1874: Edward Chaddock Lowndes, of Castle Combe
1875: Charles Paul Phipps, of Chalcot, Westbury
1876: William Henry Poynder of Hartham, Chippenham
1877: Richard Walmesley of Lucknam
1878: George Pargiter Fuller
1879: William Stancomb of Blount's Court, Devizes
1880: Sir Edward Antrobus, of Amesbury
1881: George Morrison of Hampworth Lodge, Downton, Salisbury
1882: The Right Hon. Edward Pleydell-Bouverie, of The Manor House, Market Lavington
1883: Sir Michael Robert Shaw-Stewart, Bt, of Fonthill Abbey, Salisbury
1884: Richard Leckonby Hothersall Phipps
1885: Charles Edward Hungerford Athol Colston, of Roundway Park, Devizes
1886: Sir Henry Bruce Meux, Bt, of Dauntsey House, Chippenham
1887: Clement Walker Heneage, of Compton Bassett, Calne, V.C.
1888: Charles Nicholas Paul Phipps, of Chalcot, Westbury
1889: John Edmund Philip Spicer, of Spye Park, Chippenham
1890: Sir John Poynder Dickson, Bt
1891: Herbert James Harris, of Bowden Hill House, Chippenham,
1892: Sir John William Kelk, 2nd Baronet
1893: Sir Gabriel Goldney, 1st Baronet
1894: William Henry Laverton
1895: Charles Walker
1896: Percy Wyndham
1897: Sir John Gladstone, 4th Baronet
1898: Sir William Roger Brown, Kt, of Highfield, Trowbridge
1899: Lieutenant-Colonel Wyatt William Turner, of Pinkney Park, Malmesbury
1900: Mark Hanbury Beaufoy, of Coombe House, Shaftesbury

20th century

1901: Charles Awdry of Shaw Hill, Melksham
1902: Edmund Clerke Schomberg of Clyffe Hall, Market Lavington
1903: George Palmer of Lackham, Lacock
1904: Hugh Morrison, of Fonthill, Tisbury
1905: Lieutenant-Colonel Sir Audley Dallas Neeld, Bt, C.B., M.V.O., of Grittleton
1906: Sir Gabriel Prior Goldney, Bt.,C.V.O.,C.B. of Hardenhuish Park, Chippenham
1907: Fitzroy Pleydell Goddard, of The Lawn, Swindon
1908: Frederick Hastings Goldney, of Beechfield, Corsham
1909: Captain George Hounsom Fort, of Alderbury House
1910: Sir John Tankerville Goldney, Kt, of Monks Park, Corsham
1911: William Stancomb, of Blount's Court, Devizes
1912: Sir William Heward Bell, Kt
1913: Charles Penruddocke
1914: George Simon Arthur Watson-Taylor, of Erlestoke Park
1915: Sir Henry Hugh Arthur-Hoare, 6th Baronet of Stourhead
1916: George William Wynter Blathwayt, of Melksham House, Melksham
1917: John Moulton
1918: Eustace Richardson-Cox
1919: Walter Richard Shaw-Stewart
1920: The Hon. Louis George Greville of Heale House, Upper Woodford
1921: Sir Frederick George Panizzi Preston of Landford Manor
1922: Charles Garnett of Greathouse, Kington Langley
1923: Bertram Erasmus Philipps of Dinton House, Dinton
1924: Washington Merritt Grant Singer
1925: Gerard James Buxton
1926: Robert Fleetwood Fuller
1927: Edgar Hugh Brassey
1928: Robert William Awdry
1930: Admiral John Luce
1931: Claude Basil Fry, of Hannington Hall, Highworth
1932: William Cory Heward Bell
1933: W. Llewellen Palmer
1934: Edward Harding-Newman
1935: Herbert Paton Holt
1936: George Jardine Kidston
1937: Frederick George Glyn Bailey
1938: John Granville Morrison, created Lord Margadale in 1965
1939: John Morley
1940: Rupert Stephens
1941: Lieutenant-Colonel Frederick George Glyn Bailey, of Lake House, Salisbury
1942: William Herbert Lee Ewart
1943: Sir Eric Clare Edmund Phipps
1944: William Llewellen Palmer
1945: Brudenell Hunt-Grubbe
1946: Lieutenant-Colonel Arthur Edward Phillips, D.S.O., of Elm House, Winterbourne Dauntsey
1947: Egbert Cecil Barnes of Hungerdown, Seagry
1948: Claude Alexander Codrington
1949: Samuel Vandeleur Christie-Miller
1950: Roger Money-Kyrle
1951: Brigadier Francis Ernle Fowle of The Manor, Charlton St. Peter
1952: Guy Elland Carne Rasch
1953: Sir Noel Arkell
1954: Charles Edwin Awdry, T.D., D.S.O., of Notton Lodge, Lacock
1955: Sir Geoffrey Ronald Codrington of Roche Court, Winterslow
1956: Christopher Herbert Fleetwood Fuller
1957: Arthur Guy Stratton of Manor House, Alton Priors
1958: Sir Geoffrey Tritton, 3rd Baronet
1959: Hugh Trefusis Brassey
1960: Major David Adwyne Carne Rasch of Heale House, Middle Woodford
1961: Major-General George Drew Fanshawe of Farley Farm House, Farley
1962: Charles Murray Floyd
1963: Peter Thomas Wellesley Sykes
1964: Arthur Frank Seton Sykes
1965: Geoffrey Henry Barrington Chance
1966: Christopher Henry Maxwell Peto
1967: Frank Harold Elcho Skyrme
1968: Anthony William Allen Llewellen Palmer, MC (born 1912)
1969: Edward Lancelot Luce
1970: Captain Roger Edward Lennox Harvey, of Parliament Piece, Ramsbury
1971: James Ian Morrison
1972: Nigel Bailey
1973: William Erskine Stobart

High Sheriff

20th century

1974: Martin Anthony Gibbs
1975: R. H. Heywood-Lonsdale
1976: Gerald John Ward, of Park Farm, Chilton Foliat, Hungerford, Berkshire
1977: Major Anthony Richard Tumor, of Foxley Manor, Malmesbury
1978: Count Jan Badeni, of Norton Manor, Malmesbury
1979: John Michael Stratton, of Manor Farm, Stockton
1980: Major Peter Sturgis, of Church Lodge, Dauntsey Park, Chippenham
1981: Richard Flower Stratton, of "Seagrams", Kingston Deverill
1982: Samuel George Davenport, of Codford St Mary
1983: John Heatley Noble, of Puckshipton House, near Pewsey
1984: Major General John Humphrey Stephen Bowring, of Lower Swillbrook Farm, Minety
1985: Lieut-Colonel John Godfrey Jeans, of Chalke Pyt House, Broadchalke
1986: Arthur Peter Bedingfeld Scott, of Grange Farm, Maiden, Devizes
1987: Tristram Seton Sykes, of Norrington Manor, Alvediston
1988: Bonar Hugh Charles Sykes, of Conock Manor, Devizes
1989: Beresford Norman Gibbs, of Flintham House, Oaksey
1990: Nigel James Moffatt Anderson, of Hamptworth Lodge, Landford
1991: Christopher Eliot Eliot-Cohen, of Hilldrop Farm, Ramsbury
1992: George William Michael Street, of The Dairy House, Berwick St James
1993: Lieutenant-General Sir Maurice Johnston
1994: Mrs Anna Ruth Grange, of Thomhill Farm, Malmesbury
1995: David John Randolph, of West Foscote Farm, Grittleton
1996: Andrew William Michael Christie-Miller, of Clarendon Park
1997: John Barnard Bush
1998: Lady Hawley, Little Cheverell House, Devizes
1999: Philip John Miles, of Middle Farm, Stanley
2000: Robert Lawton

21st century

2001: Richard David Stratton, Manor Farm, Kingston Deverill
2002: Sir Christopher Benson
2003: David Newbigging
2004: James Arkell
2005: David Margesson
2006: Geraldine Wimble
2007: The Honourable Peter Pleydell-Bouverie
2008: Margaret Madeline, Mrs W. W. Wilks of Pewsey
2009: Robert Charles Floyd of Great Chalfield Manor 
2010: Dame Elizabeth Louise Neville
2011: Robert Ralph Scrymgeour Hiscox of Marlborough
2012: The Hon. Laura, Lady Phillips
2013: William Francis Wyldbore-Smith
2014: Peter John Gerald Addington
2015: Sarah, Lady Gooch
2016: David Hempleman-Adams
2017: Penny, Lady Marland
2018: Mrs Nicola (Nicky) Alberry
2019: David Bedingfeld Scott, of Nursteed, Devizes
2020: Major-General Ashley Truluck
2021: Sir Charles Hobhouse Bt.
2022: The Marchioness of Lansdowne
2023: Pradeep Bhardwaj

See also
Lord Lieutenant of Wiltshire
List of Deputy Lieutenants of Wiltshire
Custos Rotulorum of Wiltshire

Notes

References
 The history of the worthies of England, Volume 3 by Thomas Fuller
The Times
Dictionary of National Biography
The House of Commons, 1690–1715 by David Hayton, Eveline Cruickshanks, Stuart Handley 2002
A List of Wiltshire Sheriffs, John Edward Jackson (H. Bull, Devizes, 1856)

External links

The Occupants of the Ancient office of High Sheriff of Wiltshire from 1067 to 1612 at tudorplace.com.ar

 
Wiltshire
History of Wiltshire
 
Wiltshire-related lists